The Battle of Tora Bora was a military engagement that took place in the cave complex of Tora Bora, eastern Afghanistan, from December 6–17, 2001, during the opening stages of the United States invasion of Afghanistan. It was launched by the United States and its allies with the objective to capture or kill Osama bin Laden, the founder and leader of the militant organization al-Qaeda. Al-Qaeda and bin Laden were suspected of being responsible for the September 11 attacks three months prior. Tora Bora (Black Cave) is located in the Spīn Ghar mountain range near the Khyber Pass. The U.S. stated that al-Qaeda had its headquarters there and that it was bin Laden's location at the time.

Background 
In Operation Cyclone during the early 1980s, CIA officers had assisted the mujahideen in extending and shoring up the caves to use for resistance during the Soviet invasion of Afghanistan. The U.S. then supported their effort. Several years later, the Taliban formed and took control of most of the country, enforcing fundamentalist rule. Several cave areas were used in much earlier periods, as the difficult terrain formed a natural defensive position and had been used by tribal warriors fighting foreign invaders.

Battle 

At the end of 2001, al-Qaeda fighters were still holding out in the mountains of the Tora Bora region.
Aerial bombardment ensued, including the use of large bombs known as daisy cutters.

On December 3, 2001, a group of 20 U.S. CIA National Clandestine Service's  (NCS) Special Activities Division and 5th Special Forces Group (Airborne) (SFG[A]) ODA572 team members, code-named Jawbreaker, were inserted by helicopter in Jalalabad, Afghanistan to begin an operation against them. On December 5, 2001, Afghan Northern Alliance fighters wrested control of the low ground below the mountain caves from al-Qaeda fighters. The Jawbreaker team and SF teams equipped with laser designators called in Air Force bombers to take out targets; non-stop heavy air strikes including laser-guided bombs and missiles lasted for 72 hours. The al-Qaeda fighters withdrew to higher fortified positions and dug in for the battle. Approximately a week later, 70 special forces operators from the Army Delta Force's A Squadron, and Air Force STS arrived overland by vehicle to support the bombing campaign with ground forces. Two British SBS Commandos from M Sqn were embedded with A Sqn Delta, one of whom continued to work for JSOC, albeit in a different capacity. During the hours of darkness, the al-Qaeda fighters would light fires, which would reveal their specific location and aid laser-designated targeting for air-launched weapons.

The Afghan Northern Alliance fighters continued a steady advance through the difficult terrain, backed by airstrikes and U.S. and British Special Forces. Facing defeat, al-Qaeda forces negotiated a truce with a local Afghan militia commander to give them time to surrender their weapons. In retrospect, however, some critics believe that the truce was a device to allow important al-Qaeda figures, including Osama bin Laden, to escape.

On December 12, 2001, the fighting flared again, possibly initiated by a rear guard buying time for the main force's escape through the White Mountains into the tribal areas of Pakistan. Tribal forces backed by U.S. special operations troops and air support pressed ahead against fortified al-Qaeda positions in caves and bunkers scattered throughout the mountainous region. Twelve British SBS commandos, and one British Royal Signals Specialist from 63 Signals squadron (now known as 18 [UKSF] Signal Regiment), accompanied the U.S. special operations forces in attacking the cave complex at Tora Bora. Special Forces Operators of the German KSK took part in the battle as well. They were reportedly responsible for protecting the flanks in the mountains and conducted reconnaissance missions.

The U.S. focus increased on the Tora Bora. Local tribal militias, paid and organized by Special Forces and CIA SAD paramilitary, numbering over 2,000 strong, continued to mass for an attack as heavy bombing continued on suspected al-Qaeda positions.

It was reported that U.S forces found small outposts and a few minor training camps. Journalist Matthew Forney, covering the battle, described being allowed access to see "rough bunkers" deep in the mountains, which he considered "remarkable."

By December 17, 2001, the last cave complex had been taken and their defenders overrun. U.S forces continued searching the area into January, but did not find any signs of bin Laden or the al-Qaeda leadership. Former CIA officer Gary Berntsen led the CIA team tasked with locating bin Laden. He said that al-Qaeda detainees had reported that bin Laden escaped into Pakistan via an easterly route to Parachinar. Berntsen believed that bin Laden could have been captured during the battle if the U.S military had committed more troops early in the battle. CIA intelligence had indicated that bin Laden and the al-Qaeda leadership were trapped in the caves early in the battle, and Berntsen had wanted to send less than 1,000 American Army Rangers to eliminate them, which he believed would have ended the War on Terror very quickly. However, the request was turned down by the Bush Administration, which had argued that the Pakistanis would capture bin Laden if he attempted to flee into Pakistan. In a 2005 interview, another former CIA agent, Gary Schroen, concurred with Berntsen's opinion. Pentagon documents suggest bin Laden escaped at Tora Bora.

Bin Laden's whereabouts 

In an October 2004 opinion article in The New York Times, General Tommy Franks, who was the general commander of U.S forces in Afghanistan at the time, wrote,

Many enemy fighters fled through the rough terrain and into tribal areas of Pakistan to the south and east. Allied forces estimated that around 200 of the al-Qaeda fighters were killed during the battle, along with an unknown number of anti-Taliban tribal fighters. No coalition deaths were reported. Bin Laden would not be seen until 2004 when a video of him surfaced on the Qatar-based Al Jazeera network 

In 2009, the United States Senate Committee on Foreign Relations led an investigation into the Battle of Tora Bora. They concluded that Secretary of Defense Donald Rumsfeld and General Tommy Franks had not committed enough troops during the battle to secure the area around Tora Bora. They believed that Osama bin Laden had likely been at Tora Bora and his escape prolonged the war in Afghanistan.

Delta Force commander's account 

The former Delta Force officer Thomas Greer, using the pen name "Dalton Fury", who was the ground force commander at Tora Bora, wrote that bin Laden escaped into Pakistan on or around December 16, 2001. Fury gives three reasons for why he believes bin Laden was able to escape: (1) the US mistakenly thought that Pakistan was effectively guarding the border area, (2) NATO allies refused to allow the use of air-dropped GATOR mines, which might have kept bin Laden and his forces inside the Tora Bora area, and (3) over-reliance on native Afghan military forces as the main force deployed against bin Laden and his fighters. Fury theorized that, because the battle took place over the holy religious month of Ramadan, the Afghan forces would leave the battlefield in the evenings to break fast, giving al-Qaeda a chance to regroup, reposition, or escape.

In an October 2008 interview on 60 Minutes, Fury said that his Delta Force team and CIA Paramilitary Officers traveled to Tora Bora after the CIA had identified bin Laden's location.  Fury's team proposed an operation to attack bin Laden's suspected position from the rear, over the 14,000 foot-high mountain separating Tora Bora from Pakistan.  He said unidentified officials at higher headquarters rejected his proposal. Fury suggested dropping GATOR mines in the passes leading away from Tora Bora, but this was also denied.  Fury and his team approached the suspected position from the front and were within 2,000 meters, but withdrew because of uncertainty over the number of al-Qaeda fighters and a lack of support from allied Afghan troops.

A short time later, the Afghan military forces declared a ceasefire with al-Qaeda. In his 2008 book, Kill bin Laden, Fury described the following. His team planned to advance again on the al-Qaeda forces, but after the cease-fire, Afghan soldiers drew their weapons on the US soldiers. After 12 hours of negotiations, the Afghans stood down, but bin Laden and his bodyguards had left. Fury reports that his team intercepted and interpreted radio calls by bin Laden in the afternoon of December 13, 2001. He said to his fighters, "the time is now, arm your women and children against the infidel."  Then, after a few hours of bombing, bin Laden broke radio silence again, saying: "Our prayers were not answered. Times are dire and bad. We did not get support from the apostate nations who call themselves our Muslim brothers. Things might have been different."  Fury said that Bin Laden's final words to his fighters that night were "I'm sorry for getting you involved in this battle if you can no longer resist, you may surrender with my blessing."

During his interview on 60 Minutes to discuss his book, Fury said that his team saw a group whom they believed to be bin Laden and his bodyguards entering a cave. The team called down several bombing attacks on the site, and believed that they had killed bin Laden.  Six months later, US and Canadian forces returned and checked several caves in the area, finding remains of al-Qaeda fighters, but not of bin Laden. Fury thought that bin Laden was injured during the bombing of the cave, but was hidden, given medical care, and assisted out of the area into Pakistan by allied local Afghans.

Guantanamo captives' accounts of the battle 
U.S. authorities have justified the continued detention of several dozen Afghan Guantanamo captives by the suspicion they had participated in the battle of Tora Bora, had been present during the battle, or had passed through the area of the battle before or after it concluded, or helped Osama bin Laden to escape.

In September 2007, Ayman Saeed Abdullah Batarfi, a Yemeni medical doctor held as an enemy combatant by the United States, was reported to have described the conditions during the battle:

Aftermath 

Following Tora Bora, UK and U.S. forces and their Afghan allies consolidated their position in the country. The Taliban and al-Qaeda forces did not give up and went into hiding. A Loya jirga or grand council of major Afghan factions, tribal leaders, and former exiles, an interim Afghan government, was established in Kabul under Hamid Karzai. Mullah Saifur Rehman, a Taliban fugitive in Paktia province, began rebuilding some of his militia forces in support of the anti-US fighters. They totaled over 1,000 by the beginning of Operation Anaconda in March 2002. The insurgents planned to use the region as a base for launching guerrilla attacks and possibly a major offensive in the style of the mujahedin during the 1980s.

U.S. forces established their main base at Bagram Air Base just north of Kabul. They used Kandahar International Airport as an important base for accepting and distributing supplies and personnel. Several outposts were established in eastern provinces to hunt for Taliban and Al-Qaeda fugitives. The number of U.S. troops operating in the country would eventually grow to more than 10,000 as efforts against the Taliban and al-Qaeda were increased.

In 2009, a U.S. Senate report concluded that the failure to capture bin Laden "[laid] the foundation for today's protracted Afghan insurgency and inflaming the internal strife now endangering Pakistan." Al-Qaeda forces began regrouping in the Shahi-Kot mountains of Paktia Province throughout January and February 2002.

In December 2009, New Republic published Peter Bergen's "The Battle for Tora Bora" In his critique of the battle, Bergen reconstructed the U.S. allies engagement at Tora Bora. He said that General Tommy Franks, then U.S. Army chief, refused to deploy 800 Army Rangers from nearby bases to assault the complex of caves where bin Laden was supposedly hiding. Bergen characterized this as "one of the greatest military blunders in recent US history". Bergen says that the US failure to capture bin Laden at the time provided energy to the Taliban. It regrouped and became stronger after U.S. officials diverted forces for the invasion of Iraq in March 2003 and war there.

U.S. intelligence agencies continued to track bin Laden. On May 2, 2011, President Barack Obama announced the death of Osama bin Laden, who was living in a compound in the city of Abbottabad, Khyber Pakhtunkhwa province, Pakistan. He was killed by a US Navy SEAL raid on the urban compound.

Tora Bora "fortress" 

Tora Bora was variously described by the Western media to be an impregnable cave fortress housing 2000 men complete with a hospital, a hydroelectric power plant, offices, a hotel, arms and ammunition stores, roads large enough to drive a tank into, and elaborate tunnel and ventilation systems. Both the British and American press published elaborate plans of the base. When presented with such plans in an NBC interview on Meet the Press, Donald Rumsfeld, the US Secretary of Defense, said, "This is serious business, there's not one of those, there are many of those".

When Tora Bora was eventually captured by the U.S., British and Afghan troops, no traces of the supposed 'fortress' were found despite painstaking searches in the surrounding areas. Tora Bora turned out to be a system of small natural caves housing at most, 200 fighters. While arms and ammunition stores were found, there were no traces of the advanced facilities claimed to exist.

In an interview published by the Public Broadcasting Service, a Staff Sergeant from the U.S. Special Forces Operational Detachment Alpha (ODA) 572, who had been in the Battle of Tora Bora described the caves:

See also 

War in Afghanistan (1978–present)
British Special Forces
CIA's Special Activities Division
Operation Anaconda
Osama Bin Laden
Death of Osama Bin Laden
U.S. Army's Delta Force
War in Afghanistan (2001–2021)
Battle of Baghuz Fawqani — The Islamic State of Iraq and the Levant's last stand in Syria

References

Further reading

Jawbreaker: The attack on bin Laden and al-Qaeda, Gary Berntsen, Three Rivers Press , Published December 24, 2006  (paperback).
Online map and picture The Washington Post. December 10, 2008.
The Long Hunt for Osama Peter Bergen, The Atlantic Monthly. Oct. 2004
Tora Bora John Bowman, CBC News Online.  Dec. 2001
The Tora Bora Fortress Myth? Edward Epstein, The Times. November 29, 2001
Lost at Tora Bora Mary Anne Weaver, The New York Times. September 11, 2005
How bin Laden got away Phillip Smucker, The Christian Science Monitor. March 4, 2002

Tora Bora Revisited: How We Failed To Get bin Laden And Why It Matters Today US Senate majority report, November 30, 2009
 

Conflicts in 2001
Afghanistan conflict (1978–present)
Battles of the War in Afghanistan (2001–2021) involving Germany
Battles of the War in Afghanistan (2001–2021) involving the United States
Operations involving American special forces
Battles of the War in Afghanistan (2001–2021) involving the United Kingdom
Battles of the War in Afghanistan (2001–2021)
2001 in Afghanistan
History of Nangarhar Province
Mountain warfare
December 2001 events in Asia
Battles in 2001